Prince Fosu, professionally known as iPappi is a Ghanaian record producer and sound engineer who hails from Kumasi in the Ashanti region.

His major productions include "Ololo" by Stonebwoy featuring Teni and "Up and Awake" by Kojo Cue and Shaker featuring Kwesi Arthur.

Early life and career 
Prince Fosu comes from Kuntenanse - Yaase in the Ashanti Region of Ghana.He started his music career in 2007 after he noticed he could better than some producers in his locality. He has secured a music publishing deal with Sony Music UK.

References 

Ghanaian record producers
Living people
Year of birth missing (living people)